The Family Man is an Indian spy thriller streaming television series created by Raj & DK. for the streaming service Amazon Prime Video and features Manoj Bajpayee as Srikant Tiwari, a middle-class man secretly working as an intelligence officer for the Threat Analysis and Surveillance Cell (TASC), a fictitious branch of the National Investigation Agency. It also stars Priyamani, Sharad Kelkar, Neeraj Madhav, Sharib Hashmi, Dalip Tahil, Sunny Hinduja and Shreya Dhanwanthary. The series is produced and directed by Raj & D.K, who also co-wrote the story and screenplay with Suman Kumar, with dialogue penned by Sumit Arora and Kumar. Samantha Ruth Prabhu was hired for the second season of the series as the main antagonist, making her foray into the digital medium with Suparn S. Verma directing a section of the season. 

The series was announced in June 2018, with the filming of the first season began simultaneously in Mumbai, Delhi, Kerala, Jammu and Kashmir, Ladakh and was wrapped up within May 2019. Filming for the second season began in November 2019, and was wrapped up in September 2020. The cinematography for the first season was handled by Azim Moolan and Nigam Bomzan, with Cameron Eric Bryson hired for the second season. Sumeet Kotla edited the series, while Ketan Sodha composed the background score.

The Family Man: Season 1 was showcased at the Television Critics Association's summer press tour held in Los Angeles in July 2019, and was eventually premiered on Amazon Prime Video on 20 September 2019. It received acclaim from critics and audiences, praising the performance of the cast members, and writing and execution. It eventually became the most viewed web series on Amazon Prime Video. The second season was scheduled to be aired on 12 February 2021 but was delayed, and it was finally released on 4 June 2021 and the season 3 is expected to be released in 2023.

The Family Man received eleven Filmfare OTT Awards, five Asian Academy Creative Awards and two awards at the Indian Film Festival of Melbourne. A third season is in development.

Premise

Season 1 
The Family Man follows the story of Srikant Tiwari, who works as a senior officer in the Threat Analysis and Surveillance Cell (TASC), along with his best friend and colleague JK Talpade, which is a part of the National Investigation Agency (NIA) of India. He is a married man with two kids. The first season follows an investigation of a potential terrorist attack, while simultaneously following his slightly unsettled family life. Srikant and JK, along with their subordinates Zoya, Milind and Jayesh, and Force One officer Imran Pasha work on stopping Mission Zulfiqar from succeeding. The show is inspired by real life newspaper articles.

Season 2 
The second season's story line focuses on a Tamil Tigers-esque military resistance from Sri Lanka and their plans for a freedom fight.

Season 3 
The third season preview at the end of season two seems to indicate a link between COVID-19 pandemic, China attacks the North-eastern states of India and they use COVID-19 as a distraction to attack on India.
It is believed that most of the shooting of the third season has been done in the North-East part of the country, especially in Nagaland.

Cast

Overview

Main 
Manoj Bajpayee as Srikant Tiwari (Sri): Senior Agent and Analyst in T.A.S.C, Suchitra's husband; Dhriti and Atharv's father.
Sharib Hashmi as Jayavant Kashinath Talpade (JK)
Priyamani as Suchitra Tiwari (Suchi): Srikant's wife; Dhriti and Atharv's mother.
 Ashlesha Thakur as Dhriti Tiwari, Srikant's daughter
 Vedant Sinha as Atharv Tiwari, Srikant's son
Neeraj Madhav as Moosa Rahman a.k.a. Al Qatil (Season 1)
Samantha Ruth Prabhu as Rajalakshmi Sekharan a.k.a. Raji (Season 2)
 Shahab Ali as Sajid Ghani
Sunny Hinduja as Millind Hinduja
Shreya Dhanwanthary as Zoya

Recurring 
Season 1
Darshan Kumar as Major Sameer
Debashish Mondal as Jayesh
Kishore Kumar as Major Imran Pasha, Force One leader
Gul Panag as Saloni Bhatt, Srikant's Commanding Officer
Pawan Chopra as Sharma
Sharad Kelkar as Arvind
 Tawhid Rike Zaman as Arvind's Friend
Vijay Vikram Singh as Ajit
Arpit Singh as Hussain
Dalip Tahil as Kulkarni
Sundeep Kishan as Major Vikram Vaid
Abrar Qazi as Kareem Bhat
Mir Sarwar as Faizan
Sanyukta Timsina as Jonali
Sunil Gupta as Ansari
Ashmith Kunder as Bilal
Zarin Shihab as Mary
Aritro Rudraneil Banerjee as Punit Banerjee
Dinesh Prabhakar as Asif
Suresh Vishwakarma as Inspector Suresh Jadhav
Sohaila Kapur as School Principal
 Ajay Jadhav as Shinde
Season 2
Pawan Chopra as Sharma
Sharad Kelkar as Arvind
Vijay Vikram Singh as Ajit
Dalip Tahil as Kulkarni
Sanyukta Timsina as Jonali
Ravindra Vijay as Muthu Pandian
Devadarshini as Umayal, Chennai Police
Mime Gopi as Bhaskaran Palanivel
Azhagam Perumal as Deepan Anthony
Anandsami as Selvarasan
Abhay Verma as Kalyaan (Salman)
Aritro Rudraneil Banerjee as Punit Banerjee
Tareeq Ahmed Khan as Syed
Kaustubh Kumar as Tanmay Ghosh, Srikant's Boss
Asif Basra as Counsellor
Seema Biswas as Basu, Indian Prime Minister
Abhishek Shankar as Lasit Rupatunga, Sri Lankan President
Uday Mahesh as Chellam
Vipin Sharma as Sambit
M. Ranjith as Karthik
Tawhid Rike Zaman as Deepan's Friend
 Krishna D. K. as Nikhil
Srikrishna Dayal as Subramaniam Palanivel (Subbu)
Rajesh Balachandiran as Prabhu
Prakash Rajan as Nanda
Shruti Bisht as Mahima
Sharik Khan as Rahul
Patrali Chattopadhyay as Gunjan
Sohaila Kapur as School Principal
Ajay Jadhav as Shinde
Tintin Raikhan as Unnamed Chinese spy who gets a go-ahead for Project Guan-Yu by his Chinese handler

Episodes

Season 1 (2019)

Season 2 (2021)

Production

Development 
In November 2017, filmmakers Raj Nidimoru and Krishna D.K. planned for directing a web series, with Akshaye Khanna being hired as the lead role. It was touted to be a socio-political thriller, with Khanna initially agreeing to the series after accepting the script finalised by Raj Nidimoru, but due to budget constraints in which Khanna charged a huge amount for the series, the makers replaced him with Manoj Bajpayee as the lead character in December 2017. The ten-episode series, tentatively titled as The Family Man, marked the digital debut of Bajpayee. On 13 June 2018, Amazon Prime Video, which bagged the streaming rights, officially announced the series, stating it as an "edgy drama-action series with a touch of wry humour, drawing from real incidents".

In an interview with Scroll.in, Raj and D.K. stated that the series is closely based to Shor in the City (2011), in terms of its tone, stating, "It is dramatic and edgy with action involved. The humour is the kind of stuff that comes just from working in and dealing with the system or bureaucracy in our country. The series draws from contemporary geopolitical issues, and most plot threads are inspired from newspaper headlines over the years." A Deccan Chronicle article released in September 2019, stated that the series features similarities from real-life events. Despite filming of the second season, the makers announced for a third season in May 2020. Soon after the release and success of a second season, a third season was announced to be in development to be set in North East India.

Casting 
Manoj Bajpayee, plays the role of Srikant Tiwari, a middle-class man who works for a cell of the National Investigation Agency. While he tries to protect the nation from terrorists, he also has to protect his family from the impact of his secretive, high-pressure, and low-paying job.
 As the storyline spans around various places in India, the makers chose actors from various states such as Karnataka, Andhra Pradesh, Kerala, Tamil Nadu, Jammu and Kashmir, Uttar Pradesh, and Maharashtra. In an interview with The Indian Express, actor Kishore Kumar G was approached by one of the writers from Y Not Studios, Sumanth, who was writing for The Family Man, to play the role of a Commando in the series. Priyamani plays the role of Suchitra, Srikanth's wife and also an associate professor in the psychology department. About her character Suchitra, she stated that "She's a typical working wife and someone who is not afraid of expressing herself. She's a multi-tasking woman and someone who, even though she has her hands full, wants to do more." Sharad Kelkar plays the role of Arvind, an associate professor, who is trying to become an entrepreneur. Neeraj Madhav, in his digital debut, plays the role of Moosa, a 24-year old IIT engineer, who gets involved with ISIS. Sundeep Kishan plays the role of Major Vikram. The cast members also includes Sharib Hashmi, Sunny Hinduja and Shreya Dhanwanthary in pivotal roles.

On 28 November 2019, Samantha Ruth Prabhu announced her confirmation in the second season of the series, thus marking her digital debut. Samantha plays the role of the main antagonist Raji, a rebel leader, with Neeraj Madhav's character Moosa is expected for a comeback in the second season. Apart from the cast members of the first season, the second season features Shahab Ali, Vedant Sinha, Mime Gopi, Ravindra Vijay, Devadarshini Chetan, Anandsami and N. Alagamperumal.

Filming

Season 1 
Filming for Season 1, took place on 13 June 2018, within the start of the announcement. Most of the portions were filmed across Mumbai, with some sequences were filmed at Ladakh, Delhi, Jammu and Kashmir and Kerala. In August 2018, Raj and Krishna stated in an interview, that a huge chunk is built in Kashmir, for which they interacted with the people in localities, exploring the livelihood of the people and their perspectives of their world they live in. The Kashmir sequences were shot first, during early 2018.

A scene featuring at the Ballad Estate (in the district of South Mumbai), was shot in a single take, with a span of 7–11 minutes. Raj and DK stated that the camera is inside the car for half the action sequence. In order to resemble the sets of Balochistan, as the team was denied permission to shoot in the country, a huge set was built in Ladakh to resemble Balochistan. Another sequence was shot in a live hospital located in Mumbai which spanned around 13 minutes. In an interview with Film Companion, the makers stated "The location was expensive and we got it only for 2 nights. We had to come up with the entire sequence and rehearse and stage everything on the first night and the next night we had to light everything and shoot. I am really proud of the team because you don't really pull off stuff like this in one day." The shooting was completed in May 2019.

Season 2 
On 28 November 2019, Raj and D. K. announced for a second season of the series, followed by the commencement of the shooting. Filming of the first schedule which took place across Mumbai, was wrapped up on 2 March 2020, before the COVID-19 pandemic lockdown in India. Filming resumed in July 2020, adhering to the safety guidelines imposed by the government, in order to curb COVID-19 spread. Samantha started dubbing for her portions on 28 August 2020, whereas Manoj Bajpayee started dubbing on 14 September. On 25 September 2020, the makers announced that the principal shoot has been wrapped, followed by the completion of the production works on 16 October. The second season focused on the Tamil Eelam struggle in Sri Lanka, led by the late LTTE leader Captain Prabhakaran. Although there were protests against the portrayal of LTTE, the series was broadcast without further issues.

Music 

The Family Man: Season 1, consists of fourteen songs used in the series. The soundtrack has music composed by Sachin–Jigar, Divya Limbasia, Mahesh Shankar, The Local Train, Jaan Nissar Lone, Aabha Hunjara, Thaikkudam Bridge and Underground Authority. For the second season, Sachin–Jigar, Fiddlecraft, Mahesh Shankar and Shonha Raja composed the music. The background score is composed by Ketan Sodha.  The albums consists of songs with Balochi, Kashmiri, Malayalam, Sanskrit and Tamil lyrics, apart from featuring songs written in Hindi languages.

Release

Season 1 
The Family Man: Season 1 was showcased at the Television Critics Association's summer press tour held in Los Angeles in February 2019. On 15 July 2019, Amazon Prime Video announced five new series in production, where a first poster released on the occasion of Prime Day celebrations. The series consisting of 10-episodes was announced for a release on September. The photoshoot of the teaser poster was shot using One Plus mobile camera, which was released on 30 August 2019, along with the teaser. The official trailer was unveiled on 2 September 2019. Amazon Prime Video released the series in English, Hindi, Tamil and Telugu languages on 19 September 2019, ahead of the initially scheduled release of 20 September, in more than 200 countries.  The series became the most-watched Indian web show on Amazon Prime Video.

Season 2 
In May 2020, filmmakers Raj and Krishna stated that the second season of the series, will be released in the last quarter of 2020, as the post-production process (sound, music creating, VFX work) may take four months to complete. But, it was eventually delayed to 2021, citing the completion of visual effects. A sneak peek of the second season was released on 20 September 2020, coinciding with the release date of the first season. A new poster of the second season was released on 29 December 2020, and on 7 January 2021, the makers announced the release date as 12 February 2021. The makers unveiled the teaser of the second season on 13 January 2021. In order to promote the trailer launch event on 19 January 2021, Amazon Prime Video announced that the first season of the series, will be made accessible to all users without subscriptions, from 14 to 19 January. However, the trailer was not eventually released, due to the controversy surrounding over Tandav, which premiered on the same platform.

In late January 2021, there were reports claiming that the second season will be postponed due to the legal tussles revolving over Amazon Prime and their series Tandav and Mirzapur, for hurting religious sentiments. It was reported that the series feature similar content to that of the former and Amazon Prime had decided to postpone the season in the outburst of controversies, so that they have time to edit the series, as a part of post-production. The same was confirmed by the creator duo Raj and DK, however they did not quote the controversy over Tandav.

The trailer was later released on 19 May 2021, and the episodes were released a few hours before midnight on 4 June 2021. Due to technical issues, episodes were released only in Hindi and not in Tamil or Telugu on that day. The dubbed versions were released during mid-August 2021.

Controversies

Season 1 
On 28 September 2019, the Rashtriya Swayamsevak Sangh raised objection to the concerns over a few scenes in the web series about the situation in Jammu and Kashmir. An RSS-affiliated magazine Panchajanya stated that "In the series, a woman affiliated to the National Investigation Agency is shown speaking to her male colleague at Srinagar's Lal Chowk, decrying the fact that the Kashmiris were being oppressed by the Indian state as it had shut down phones and internet and used measures like the Armed Forces (Special Powers) Act. At one point she asks her male colleague, who appears quite affected by her talk, whether there is any difference between the Indian officials and militants." The magazine also accused the makers for creating sympathy for terrorists.

Season 2 
On 24 May 2021, the Government of Tamil Nadu wrote to the Central government seeking immediate action either to stop or ban the release of the second season of the series on Amazon Prime Video across the country. Mano Thangaraj, Information Technology Minister of Tamil Nadu, in his letter to Prakash Javadekar, Union Minister for Information and Broadcasting, said, "the web series (due to release in June 2021) not only hurt the sentiments of Eelam Tamils but also the feelings of the people of Tamil Nadu and if allowed to broadcast, it would be prejudicial to the maintenance of harmony in the State". Several other Tamil Nadu political leaders, including Seeman and Vaiko condemned the series, stating that, the series depicts Tamilians as terrorists and demanded a pan-India ban.

Reception

Critical response

Season 1 
Rohan Naahar of the Hindustan Times wrote "Without ever parodying the genre, The Family Man succeeds at being a surprisingly funny spy series; equally capable of snappy one-liners as it is of slick thrills." Karan Sanjay Shah of Rediff.com rated it four out of five and called it a "raw, engaging, well-written espionage drama that will keep you on the edge of your seat". Suresh Mathew of The Quint gave it a three-and-a-half out of five and distinguished it from Sacred Games by saying, "What makers Raj and DK bring to The Family Man is a total mastery over the craft of storytelling. Unlike, say a Sacred Games, The Family Man manages to remain eminently accessible while still retaining its finesse."

Ektaa Malik of The Indian Express gave three out of five stars, stating "The performances by Manoj Bajpayee and Sharib Hashmi are stellar as are the dialogues." Raja Sen of Mint also appreciated Bajpayee's role saying, "Bajpayee is alone reason enough to keep watching The Family Man." Swetha Ramakrishnan of Firstpost gave three out of five stars and stated, "The Family Man's version of a family man is someone who can't juggle his work duties and familial duties and we're supposed to find the comedy in that." Akhil Arora of NDTV wrote "On one hand, The Family Man shows itself to be very socially and politically aware but its inelegant handling of exposition, and inability to be tonally cohesive lets it down." Ananya Bhattacharya of India Today wrote "Despite Manoj Bajpayee's work, The Family Man is really a dampener."

Nandini Ramanth of Scroll.in reviewed "There are moments in the early episodes when it appears that Raj and DK are sending up the tradecraft genre and not taking this terrorist-hunting business too seriously. It is sometimes hard to tell whether Srikant is being serious or sardonic. Manoj Bajpayee's ability to suggest both states initially keeps The Family Man in a midway zone between muscular nationalist thriller and a True Lies-style spoof." A critic from Indo-Asian News Service gave three-and-a-half out of five stars and stated "If you like binge-watching, this one is for you. Like many of the characters in it, The Family Man leaves us viewers with no choice."

The New Indian Express's critic Kaushani Bannerjee reviewed "Despite the pace and the predictability of things, the show neither tries to be preachy about tolerance or peace nor portrays a black and white picture of patriots and terrorists. It depicts both sides of the story in a balanced manner underscoring the fact that nobody is born a terrorist and even the hero needs to deal with mundane issues of life." Rahul Desai of Film Companion wrote "It's in the smaller – and uncompromising – details of The Family Man that we sense how director-duo Raj & D.K. can transcend their 'quirky' reputation if given the leeway".

Tanul Thakur of The Wire stated "The Family Man is elevated to a large extent by not just its writing and technical finesse – making the show tense and unpredictable – but also acting." Jennifer Keishin Armstrong of BBC News reviewed that "The Family Man turns on such satisfying juxtapositions, constantly pitting Sri's disastrous personal instincts against his superhuman – though not infallible – skill in his role at the National Investigation Agency, rooting out terrorists who flourish in and around India (his family thinks he has an ordinary desk job)."

Season 2 
Shubhra Gupta from The Indian Express stated "The Manoj Bajpayee show significantly raises its stakes in the second season, casting its net wider, and manages to get in a larger context about the state of the world we are living in." Tatsam Mukherjee from First Post exclaimed high praises for the season 2 stating "The Family Man S02 is a stellar continuation of a homegrown spy franchise, one that seamlessly switches between Tamil, Hindi and English." Sangeetha Devi Dundoo from The Hindu wrote "The new season of 'The Family Man' is fun and absorbing, led by the ever-dependable Manoj Bajpayee and a fiery Samantha Ruth Prabhu."

Accolades

Notes

References

External links 

2019 Indian television series debuts
Amazon Prime Video original programming
Indian action television series
Indian crime television series
Television shows set in Jammu and Kashmir
Terrorism in television
Television shows set in Quetta
Television shows set in Islamabad
Television shows set in Pakistan
Television shows set in Sri Lanka
Kashmir conflict in fiction
Sri Lankan Civil War in popular culture
Indian Peace Keeping Force